Jendrik Sigwart (born 27 August 1994), better known by the mononym Jendrik, is a German singer and musical performer who represented Germany at the Eurovision Song Contest 2021 in Rotterdam, Netherlands with his song "I Don't Feel Hate".

Early life and career
Jendrik Sigwart grew up in Hamburg-Volksdorf and has four siblings. He learned piano and violin as a teenager and studied musicals for four years at the Institute for Music at the Osnabrück University of Applied Sciences. While still a student, he appeared in various musicals, including German productions of My Fair Lady, Hairspray and Peter Pan. Sigwart began his career in 2016, where he released "Dibdibidi".

Eurovision
On 6 February 2021, it was announced that he had been selected internally to represent Germany at Eurovision Song Contest in Rotterdam bypassing the German representative to the Eurovision Song Contest 2020 Ben Dolic. 

Sigwart self-penned the entry, "I Don't Feel Hate". It was released on 25 February, 2021. A music video was also released. The song was produced by Christoph Oswald.

At Eurovision, Sigwart performed 15th in the running order. He ultimately finished 25th (second last) in the final, receiving three jury points and zero televote points.

Personal life
Sigwart lives in Hamburg with his boyfriend Jan.

Discography

Singles

References

External links
 
 Facebook

21st-century German male singers
1994 births
Eurovision Song Contest entrants for Germany
Eurovision Song Contest entrants of 2021
German LGBT singers
Gay singers
German gay musicians
Living people
Musicians from Hamburg
Osnabrück University of Applied Sciences alumni